Dick Wilson (July 30, 1916 – November 18, 2007) was an American actor who was best known as grocery store manager Mr. George Whipple in more than 500 Charmin bathroom tissue television commercials (1965–89, 1999–2000).

Biography
Dick Wilson was born in Preston, Lancashire in 1916. His father soon moved the family to Hamilton, Ontario, Canada. He got his start in show business with a part-time job at CHML radio in Hamilton at age fifteen. He graduated from the Ontario College of Art & Design. Paid in dance lessons, he became a comedic acrobatic dancer and performed in vaudeville for 20 years, according to Procter & Gamble.

Wilson had taught himself to fly when he was 16 years old, working for a time as a bush pilot who flew supplies to mining camps in remote regions of Canada. His earlier experience got him into military flight training and he became a bomber pilot. After the Second World War where he served in the Royal Canadian Air Force and Royal Air Force, he moved to the United States and became an American citizen in 1954, heading to California that same year to work as a film and television actor.

Wilson made numerous appearances on Bewitched. He also appeared on Tabitha and McHale's Navy. He also appeared on The Donna Reed Show, Hogan's Heroes, and The Bob Newhart Show. Wilson was quoted as saying, "I've done thirty-eight pictures and nobody remembers any of them, but they all remember me selling toilet paper." He made 504 commercials as Mr. Whipple, earning U.S. $300,000 annually and working only 12–16 days a year.

In an interview with ABC News on April 22, 1983, he mentioned that the first series of commercials for Charmin he appeared in were filmed in, appropriately enough, Flushing, New York City. He described acting in commercials as "the hardest thing to do in the entire acting realm. You've got 24 seconds to introduce yourself, introduce the product, say something nice about it and get off gracefully."

Death
Wilson died on November 18, 2007, at the Motion Picture and Television Hospital in Woodland Hills, California, at the age of 91. He was survived by his wife, Meg; his son, Stuart F. Wilson (a stunt coordinator); his two daughters (Wendy Wilson and actress Melanie Wilson); and his five grandchildren. He was buried at Forest Lawn Memorial Park, Hollywood Hills.

Filmography

The Adventures of Jim Bowie (1956, TV Series) — Woodsman
The Tattered Dress (1957) — First Jury Foreman (uncredited)
Jane Wyman Presents The Fireside Theatre (1958, TV Series) — Alex
Sergeant Preston of the Yukon (1956–1958, TV Series) — Beaver Louie, Jake Lucas
Wagon Train (1958, TV Series) — Bartender
The Texan (1958, TV Series) — Norm Seevey
Official Detective (1958, US series - Episode: "Loan Companies") — Injured Man (uncredited)
Tales of Wells Fargo (1959, TV Series) — The Cafe Owner
The Untouchables (1959, TV Series) — Sheriff Wilson
M Squad (1958–1960, TV Series) — Max
Maverick (1960, TV Series) — Crenshaw
The Rifleman (1960, TV Series) — Fred — Buckshot Patient
The Millionaire (1960, TV Series) — Sullvian
Bat Masterson (1961, TV Series) — Tobias Tinker
The Deputy (1961, TV Series) — Barber
The Lawless Years (1959–1961, TV Series) — Charley
The Bob Cummings Show (1961, TV Series)
X-15 (1961) — Flight Engineer (uncredited)
Checkmate (1962, TV Series) — Clerk
Our Man Higgins (1962, TV Series) — Fletcher
The Virginian (1962, TV Series) — Bartender
Perry Mason (1963, TV Series) — Prisoner
Diary of a Madman (1963) — Martin
Ben Casey (1963, TV Series) — Jake Martin
Glynis (1963, TV Series)' — Danny
The Twilight Zone
Episode: Escape Clause (1959) — Insurance Man #1
Episode: Ninety Years Without Slumbering (1963) — Clock Mover
The Great Adventure (1964, TV Series) — Mr. Metcalf
What a Way to Go! (1964) — Driscoll (uncredited)
Bob Hope Presents the Chrysler Theatre (1964, TV Series)
My Living Doll (1964, TV Series) — Salesman
My Favorite Martian 
Episode: How to be a Hero Without Really Trying (1963) — Patrol Man No. 2
Episode: Uncle Martin's Broadcast (1964) - Charlie
Episode: The Night Life of Uncle Martin (1964) — Davey
Gomer Pyle, U.S.M.C. (1964, TV Series) — Clerk #3
John Goldfarb, Please Come Home! (1965) — Frobish (Whitepaper's assistant) (as Richard Wilson)
The Fugitive (1965, TV Series) — Berger 
The Loner (1965, TV Series) — Bartender
Gidget(1965, TV Series) — Mr. Lefferts 
Bewitched (1965, Episode 8 "The Very Informal Dress") — Montague
The Munsters (1965, TV Series) — Al
McHale's Navy (1965–1966, TV Series) — Dino Baroni
Our Man Flint (1966) — Supervisor of conditioning (uncredited)
The Ghost and Mr. Chicken (1966) — Bandmaster (uncredited)
My Mother the Car (1966, TV Series) — Jenkins
Bewitched (1966, TV Series) - Mr Solow
The Jean Arthur Show (1966, TV Series) — Angelo Liguori
The Hero (1966, TV Series)
Occasional Wife (1967, TV Series) — Waiter
That Girl (1967, TV Series) — Clerk
Caprice (1967) — Headwaiter (uncredited)
Petticoat Junction (1967, TV Series) — Airline Clerk
The Flying Nun (1967, TV Series) — Joe
Stay Away, Joe (1968) — Car salesman (uncredited)
The Shakiest Gun in the West (1968) — Black Eagle (Indian chief) (uncredited)
Star! (1968) — Drunk (uncredited)
Get Smart (1966–1968, TV Series) — Creevley, Spiegel
Mayberry R.F.D. (1968, TV Series) — Ralph Carr
Bewitched (1968, Episode 8 "Is It Magic Or Imagination") — man in bar
The Queen and I (1969, TV Series) — Man
I Dream of Jeannie(1966–1969, TV Series) — Dockweiler 
Bracken's World (1969) — Harry
The Good Guys (1969, TV Series) — Ira
The Partridge Family (1971, TV Series) — Cowboy
Hogan's Heroes (1966–1971, TV Series) — Captain Gruber
Marcus Welby, M.D. (1971, TV Series) — Health Faddist
Nanny and the Professor (1971, TV Series) — Simon Mehlin
Love, American Style (1971, TV Series) — Mr. Hutton (segment Love and the Bashful Groom)
McMillan & Wife (1972, TV Series) — Simon Mehlin
Getting Away from It All (1972, TV Movie) — Kirk Lecount
Bewitched (1965–1972, TV Series) — Drunk
The World's Greatest Athlete (1973, TV Movie) — Drunk in bar
Love Thy Neighbor (1973, TV Series)
Adam-12 (1973, TV Series) — Louis Nelson
The Whiz Kid and the Mystery at Riverton (1974, TV Series) — Mr. Hodges
Disneyland (1974, TV Series) — Mr. Hodges
The Bob Newhart Show (1973–1975, TV Series) — Man
Maude (1975–1976, TV Series) — Man
Tabitha (1977, TV Series) — Mr. Green
Fantasy Island (1978, TV Series) — Minister
The Pirate (1978, TV Series) — Drunk
Alice (1979, TV Series) — Drunk
Presenting Susan Anton (1979, TV Series) — Regular
Better Late Than Never (1979, TV Movie)
Quincy, M.E. (1980, TV Series) — Car salesman
The Incredible Shrinking Woman (1981) — Store Manager
Get Out of My Room (1985)
Mathnet (1987) — Grocer
Square One TV (1987, TV Series) — Grocer

References

External links
 
 
 An interview with Dick Wilson
 Obituary in the Inland Valley Daily Bulletin
 

1916 births
2007 deaths
American male film actors
American male television actors
Burials at Forest Lawn Memorial Park (Hollywood Hills)
Canadian World War II pilots
English emigrants to Canada
English emigrants to the United States
English people of Italian descent
Male actors from Lancashire
Royal Air Force airmen
20th-century American male actors